The 1996–97 Czech 1.liga season was the fourth season of the Czech 1.liga, the second level of ice hockey in the Czech Republic. 14 teams participated in the league, and HC Becherovka Karlovy Vary and HC Kralupy nad Vltavou were promoted to the Czech Extraliga.

Regular season

Relegation 
 SK Karviná – SK Horácká Slavia Třebíč 0:4 (2:3, 1:6, 2:4, 3:4)
 HC Baník Sokolov – SK Agropodnik Znojmo 0:4 (2:3 n.V., 0:1, 1:5, 1:4)

External links
 Season on hockeyarchives.info

2
Czech
Czech 1. Liga seasons